Baclaran is a barangay located in the northern area of the city of Parañaque, Metro Manila, Philippines. It is also known to be located at the borders of the cities of Parañaque and Pasay.

Because of its proximity to the seashore, the place was named after a piece of fishing equipment called "". Baklad is a rattan fence placed around the fish to protect them until they are ready to be sold in the market. Many of these  were assembled at the seashore, so people started calling the place "Bakladan". The Filipino grammatical feature of changing d's to r's when a suffix is added changed this to "Baclaran".

History
Baclaran was established in 1971 in the municipality, now city, of Parañaque. In 1973, Cardinal Karol Józef Wojtyła (later Pope John Paul II), then the Archbishop of Kraków, visited the Baclaran Church and celebrated Mass there during a brief, unofficial stopover in Manila, which was his first visit to the Philippines. In 1981, Wojtyła as Pope John Paul II returned to the shrine as part of his apostolic visit to the Philippines.

The area is well known for the National Shrine of Our Mother of Perpetual Help, also known as the Redemptorist Church or Baclaran Church, dedicated to Our Mother of Perpetual Help. The first Wednesday of every month is dedicated to the shrine of Our Lady of Perpetual Help. There was also once Muslim mosque, the Baclaran Mosque, now demolished by the City of Pasay. Baclaran is known for its children and youth membership in the local rondalla, which won at NAMCYA in 1996, and the Drum and Lyre Band, as well as its street welding. There are a number of flea markets occupying the westbound lane of Taft Avenue.

Transportation
Located near the intersection of Epifanio de los Santos Avenue and Roxas Boulevard, Baclaran is a major transportation hub and transfer point. The Baclaran station, the southern terminal station of the Manila Light Rail Transit System Line 1 located in Pasay, serves the barangay. Line 1 Extension is currently under construction to extend the line southwards to Cavite, with Redemptorist station being built in the barangay. Many bus and jeepney routes pass through Baclaran or have it as their end destination, especially transportation to and from the province of Cavite to the south.  Baclaran also has the closest street near the four airport terminals in Metro Manila, more known as the Airport Road. Wednesdays are generally busier as novena devotees come to pray at the Baclaran Church.

Cycle rickshaws can also be used to navigate the interior streets.

References

Barangays of Metro Manila
Parañaque
Shopping districts and streets in Metro Manila
Populated places established in 1971
1971 establishments in the Philippines